South Carolina Highway 216 (SC 216) is a  primary state highway in the state of South Carolina. The highway travels north–south, from the Kings Mountain National Military Park to North Carolina Highway 216 (NC 216) at the North Carolina state line.

Route description

SC 216 is a short  two-lane rural highway in the northeast corner of Cherokee County. At its southern terminus at the Kings Mountain National Military Park entrance, the road continues east park-maintained towards York County and SC 161. SC 216 passes through a partly forested area with some homes along the road as wells as intersecting three minor state secondary roads during its journey. At the state line, NC 216 continues north towards Interstate 85 and U.S. Route 29 (US 29) south of Kings Mountain.

History

The current SC 216 was established between 1960 and 1964 as a new primary route.

The first SC 216 existed from 1939 to 1948, starting off as a  spur of US 21 in Sheldon.  In 1940 it was extended to a loop; but after one year, half of the loop was downgraded as secondary road.  By 1948, the route was decommissioned.

Junction list

See also

References

External links

SC 216 at Virginia Highways' South Carolina Highways Annex

216
Transportation in Cherokee County, South Carolina